Trude Marstein (born 18 April 1973, in Tønsberg) is a Norwegian author. She attended Telemark University College and studied creative writing studies. At the University of Oslo she studied pedagogy, psychology, and the history of literature. She debuted in 1998 with a collection of prose titled Sterk sult, plutselig kvalme, for which she received Tarjei Vesaas' debutantpris.

Bibliography
Sterk sult, plutselig kvalme, (English title: Strong Hunger, Sudden Nausea) collected prose (1998)
Plutselig høre noen åpne en dør, (English title: Suddenly Hearing Someone Open a Door) novel (2000)
Happy Birthday, children's book  (2002)
Elin og Hans, (English title: Elin and Hans) novel (2002)
Konstruksjon og inderlighet, essay collection (2004)
Byens ansikt – drama (2005) together with Aasne Linnestå, Rune Christiansen, Gunnar Wærness & John Erik Riley
Gjøre godt, novel (2006)
Ingenting a angre pa, novel (2010)
Hjem til meg, novel (2012)
Sa mye hadde jeg, novel (2018)

Awards
Tarjei Vesaas' debutantpris 1998, for Sterk sult, plutselig kvalme
Sult-prisen 2002
Vestfolds Litteraturpris 2002
Dobloug Prize 2004
Norwegian Critics Prize for Literature 2006, for Gjøre godt
PO Enquists pris 2007

References

1973 births
Living people
21st-century Norwegian novelists
Norwegian Critics Prize for Literature winners
Telemark University College alumni
University of Oslo alumni
Writers from Tønsberg
Dobloug Prize winners
21st-century Norwegian women writers